() is a nationwide chain of confectionery stores and restaurants in Japan. Its first shop was founded in 1910 in Yokohama.

Fujiya is credited with introducing the Christmas cake to Japan.

In 2016, the company opened its first store outside Japan in Taipei, Taiwan.

Mascot

Fujiya's mascot is Peko-chan, a girl in pigtails licking her lips. Peko-chan is a well-known marketing icon in Japan, where life-sized dolls of the mascot are commonly seen nationwide standing outside the chain's stores.

2007 ingredients scandal
In January 2007, Fujiya was the subject of a scandal when it became known that the company had used expired ingredients in its products, prompting the resignation of its president, Rintaro Fujii.

References

External links

Fujiya - Official website (Japanese)
Fujiya restaurants - official site (Japanese)

Retail companies based in Tokyo
Food and drink companies based in Tokyo
Japanese brands
Confectionery companies of Japan
Restaurants in Japan
Food and drink companies established in 1910
Retail companies established in 1910
Restaurants established in 1910
Companies listed on the Tokyo Stock Exchange